Ostraka is an academic journal published semiannually from 1992–2012 and roughly annually thereafter by the Istituto di studi comparati sulle società antiche of the University of Perugia in Perugia, Italy. It publishes research by professionals into the archaeology of classical antiquity.

External links
  WorldCat entry

Classics journals
Archaeology journals